Bounama Touré (12 February 1953 – 11 April 2016) was a Senegalese wrestler. He competed in the men's Greco-Roman 130 kg at the 1992 Summer Olympics.

References

1953 births
2016 deaths
Senegalese male sport wrestlers
Olympic wrestlers of Senegal
Wrestlers at the 1992 Summer Olympics
Place of birth missing